Phyllomelia is a genus of flowering plants belonging to the family Rubiaceae.

Its native range is the Caribbean region.

Species
Species:
 Phyllomelia coronata Griseb.

References

Rubiaceae
Rubiaceae genera